Lazarides is a surname. Notable people with the surname include:

 Apo Lazaridès (1925–1998), French cyclist, brother of Lucien
 Lucien Lazaridès (1922–2005), French cyclist
 Steve Lazarides (born 1969), English art dealer

See also
 Lazaridis

Surnames of Greek origin